The South American Under-21 Championship for Men is a sporadically held basketball tournament. With the FIBA Americas Under-21 Championship having not been held since 2004 and no plans to hold it in the near future, this tournament's future is in doubt. The 2004 iteration was the fourth time the tournament had been held as either an under-22 or under-21 tournament.

South American Championship for Men "22 and Under" 1996

South America Championship Under 21 for men 2000

South America Championship Under 21 for men 2004, Ancud, Chile, June 14 – June 20

See also
FIBA South America Under-15 Championship
FIBA South America Under-17 Championship

External links
http://www.cbb.com.br/competicoes/SulAmericanoSub21M2004/index.asp
Under-21
South
Basketball U21